Adam Shields (born 8 February 1977 in Kurri Kurri, New South Wales), is an Australian international speedway rider who has ridden for multiple teams in the British speedway.

Speedway career
He first rode in the UK for Premier League team the Isle of Wight Islanders in 2002, before stepping up to the Elite League for Eastbourne Eagles and then the Lakeside Hammers in 2007. He missed the end of the 2008 season due a number of injuries sustained during a race.

Adam has appeared in the Speedway World Cup for Australia and he won the Australian Under-21 Speedway Championship in 1997. In 2002, he won the Premier League Riders Championship.

On 5 May 2012, Shields announced his retirement from the sport, citing personal reasons, but returned in 2013 with Eastbourne.

References

1977 births
Living people
Australian speedway riders
Eastbourne Eagles riders
Isle of Wight Islanders riders
Lakeside Hammers riders